Mirle  is a village in the southern state of Karnataka, India. It is located in the Saligrama taluk of Mysore district.

When persecuted by the Chola king Kulottunga, Ramanujacharya is said to have fled the Chola country and first stayed at Vahnipushkarini, the place now known as Mirle from where he moved on to Saligrama.

Demographics
 India census, Mirle had a population of 6075 with 3015 males and 3060 females.

See also
Saligrama, Mysore
Mysore
 Districts of Karnataka

References

External links

Villages in Mysore district